The 2019 Svijany Open was a professional tennis tournament played on clay courts. It was the 7th edition of the tournament which was part of the 2019 ATP Challenger Tour. It took place in Liberec, Czech Republic between 29 July and 4 August 2019.

Singles main-draw entrants

Seeds

 1 Rankings are as of 22 July 2019.

Other entrants
The following players received wildcards into the singles main draw:
  Jonáš Forejtek
  Jiří Lehečka
  Tomáš Macháč
  Petr Nouza
  David Poljak

The following player received entry into the singles main draw as a special exempt:
  Mario Vilella Martínez

The following players received entry into the singles main draw as alternates:
  Fabien Reboul
  Michael Vrbenský

The following players received entry into the singles main draw using their ITF World Tennis Ranking:
  Corentin Denolly
  Sadio Doumbia
  Peter Heller
  Vít Kopřiva
  Karim-Mohamed Maamoun

The following players received entry from the qualifying draw:
  Pavel Nejedlý
  Jaroslav Pospíšil

The following player received entry as a lucky loser:
  Lubomír Majšajdr

Champions

Singles

  Nikola Milojević def.  Rogério Dutra Silva 6–3, 3–6, 6–4.

Doubles

  Jonáš Forejtek /  Michael Vrbenský def.  Nikola Čačić /  Antonio Šančić 6–4, 6–3.

References

2019 ATP Challenger Tour
2019
2019 in Czech tennis
Sport in Liberec
July 2019 sports events in Europe
August 2019 sports events in Europe